Alan Walter Eastham, Jr (born October 16, 1951 in Dumas, Arkansas) was the American Ambassador to the Congo from 2008 until 2010.  He was also Ambassador to Malawi from 2005 until 2008 and U.S. Consul General in Bordeaux, France beginning in 1994.

Born and raised in Dumas, Arkansas, he graduated from Hendrix College with a degree in philosophy and earned a Juris Doctor degree from the Georgetown University Law Center. He’s been a Senior Fellow in International Relations
and International Programs at Hendrix.

References

 

Georgetown University Law Center alumni
Hendrix College alumni
Ambassadors of the United States to the Republic of the Congo
Ambassadors of the United States to Malawi
American consuls
Hendrix College faculty
People from Dumas, Arkansas
1951 births
Living people
21st-century American diplomats